Dame Louisa Jane Wilkinson,  ( Lumsden; 11 December 1889 – 4 December 1968) was a British military nurse and nursing administrator who served as Matron-in-Chief of the Queen Alexandra's Imperial Military Nursing Service (QAIMNS) from 1944 to 1948. She founded  Queen Alexandra's Royal Army Nursing Corps (QARANC), and was also president of the Royal College of Nursing.

Personal life
Wilkinson was born Louisa Lumsden in Sunderland, the daughter of merchant seaman James Lumsden and Louisa Lumsden (née Benskin). She was educated at Bede Collegiate School in Sunderland and Thornbeck Collegiate School in Darlington. On 20 December 1917 she married Captain Robert John Wilkinson of the Royal Irish Fusiliers at the Fulham register office, but he was killed in action in France on 2 July 1918.

She died in 1968 in Crowborough of a coronary thrombosis.

Nursing career
She saw service as a nurse during both World Wars.

The 22-year-old Lumsden began her nursing training in 1911 at the Royal Infirmary in Sunderland. She had just finished her training when the First World War began in August 1914, and she promptly enlisted as a reserve in Queen Alexandra's Imperial Military Nursing Service (QAIMNS). She served in hospitals in the UK and Malta prior to her marriage in 1917.

After the First World War, Wilkinson became a regular member of the QAIMNS, starting as a staff nurse in the UK. In 1926 she was posted to India.

In the Second World War, after returning to the UK, she was principal matron at the War Office, tasked to set up nursing services for the war. In 1942 she went back to India to organise the Indian military nursing services and centres for auxiliary nursing with the rank of Chief Principal Matron. She organised a training programme in nursing for Indian women that included postgraduate training in nursing administration.

She was appointed Matron in Chief from 1944 until she retired in 48, and after retirement was named Colonel Commandant from 1948 - 1950.

Dame Louisa Wilkinson was involved in bringing the QAIMNS and the Territorial Army Nursing Service together in 1948 as the Queen Alexandra's Royal Army Nursing Corps. She was the first Controller Commandant until 1954. She also founded the QARANC Association. She was President of the Royal College of Nursing in 1948.

Honours
1919: British Empire Medal
1919: Associate of the Royal Red Cross (ARRC) second class.
1941: Royal Red Cross (RRC) first class 
1943: Officer of the Order of the British Empire (OBE) for her work in India.
1946: Commander of the Order of the British Empire (CBE)
1948: Dame Commander of the Order of the British Empire (DBE) military division

References

External links
 Photo at NPG profile

1889 births
1968 deaths
People from Sunderland
Queen Alexandra's Royal Army Nursing Corps officers
British nursing administrators
Dames Commander of the Order of the British Empire
British women in World War I
British women in World War II
Presidents of the Royal College of Nursing
British Army personnel of World War I
British Army personnel of World War II
Members of the Royal Red Cross
Deaths from coronary thrombosis